Electrolier is a fixture for holding electric lamps. Normally, the term designates an elaborate light fixture suspended from above,  such as a large, multi-bulb pendant light.  Additionally, the term is used by architects in the United States to refer to electric street lights or any exterior light fixture mounted on a pole or standard.  The word is analogous to chandelier, from which it was formed. 

An example usage of the term is found in Sir John Betjeman’s poem "The Metropolitan Railway - Baker Street Station Buffet" from his collection "A Few Late Chrysanthemums" (1954): 
"Early Electric! With what radiant hope / Men formed this many-branched electrolier, / Twisted the flex around the iron rope / And let the dazzling vacuum globes hang clear, / And then with hearts the rich contrivance fill’d / Of copper, beaten by the Bromsgrove Guild."

References

Light fixtures